BP Crucis (x-ray source GX 301-2) is an X-ray binary system containing a blue hypergiant and a pulsar.

System
BP Crucis is considered as the optical counterpart to the X-ray source GX 301-2.  The system consists of a massive hypergiant star and a neutron star in an eccentric 41.5 day orbit.  The distance is likely to be between three and four thousand parsecs.  It is heavily reddened and has a K-band infrared magnitude of 5.72.

There is a mass transfer from the hypergiant to the pulsar which occurs via a dense accretion disc.  This produces a cyclotron effect with electron energies of 37 and 48 keV.

Variability

The system shows both optical and x-ray variability.  Although no eclipses are observed, the x-ray luminosity varies during the orbit with large x-ray flares being observed during periastron passages.  The system is an optical variable showing brightness changes of up to 0.08 magnitudes at visible wavelengths.  These have been attributed to ellipsoidal variations as the hypergiant rotates and to α Cygni variability.  There is an intrinsic pseudo-period of 11.9 days as well as small variations corresponding to the orbital period. That X-ray emission comes not from the neutron star itself, but rather represent a radiation re-emitted by optically thick accretion shell.

Properties
BP Crucis is around 43 times as massive as the Sun, it is also one of the most luminous stars known in the Galaxy, with an estimated bolometric luminosity of around 470,000 times that of the Sun and a radius 70 times that of the Sun.

The neutron star appears to belong to the "high mass" variety being at least . The pulsar has a spin period of 685 seconds, but shows relatively large spindown rates thought to be due to its strong magnetic field, and also occasional spinups due to interaction with the accretion disk. It is calculated that a slowly spinning neutron star could be spun up to the current rotation rate by accretion in only ten years.

References

External links
 Swift/BAT transient monitor results

Crux (constellation)
B-type hypergiants
Emission-line stars
Crucis, BP
J12263756-6246132
Rotating ellipsoidal variables
X-ray binaries
Pulsars